Alison Mackey is a linguist who specializes in applied linguistics, second language acquisition and research methodology. She is currently a professor in the Department of Linguistics at Georgetown University. Her research focuses on applied linguistics and research methods.

Career 
Since 1998, Alison Mackey has been a professor at Georgetown University.  She also does research in the Department of Linguistics and English Language at Lancaster University during summers since 2012.

Mackey is the Editor-in-Chief of the Cambridge University Press journal, Annual Review of Applied Linguistics.

Mackey is a co-founder of IRIS (the Instruments for Second Language Research digital repository).

She is also a series editor of the Routledge Second Language Acquisition Research series.

Mackey published two articles in The Guardian, one suggesting that different types and levels of motivation might be a key to second language learning, and a follow-up piece on What happens in the brain when you learn a language?.

Research
Mackey's most cited book is "Second language research: methodology and design" (with Susan M. Gass) and her most cited journal article is Conversational Interaction and Second Language Development: Recasts, Responses, and Red Herrings? (with Jenefer Philp), published in The Modern Language Journal in 1998. One of her most important contributions to the research methodology area is her second most highly cited book "Stimulated recall methodology in second language research," which established this data collection approach as a key part of the second language research area.

Publications
Mackey has publications in the major applied linguistics research journals, including Studies in Second Language Acquisition, The Modern Language Journal, Language Teaching Research, Applied Linguistics, System, TESOL Quarterly, the AILA Review, Language Learning, and International Review of Applied Linguistics in Language Teaching, amongst others. She has published books with Oxford University Press, Cambridge University Press, Routledge, Taylor and Francis, John Benjamins, Wiley-Blackwell and Lawrence Erlbaum.

Mackey has also published one popular audience book, The Bilingual Edge: Why, when and how to teach a child second language (HarperCollins, with Kendall King). This book has been translated into multiple foreign languages.

Awards
2016: Kenneth W. Mildenberger Prize (with Susan Gass)

Bibliography

Books

 Culpeper, J., Mackey, A. & Taguchi, N. (2018). Second language pragmatics: From theory to research. Routledge. (Nominated for the 2019 AAAL book award)
Gass, S.M., & Mackey, A. (2017). Stimulated Recall Methodology in Applied Linguistics and L2 Research.  Routledge.
Mackey, A., & Marsden, E. (Eds.). (2016). Instruments for research into second language.  Taylor and Francis.
Mackey, A., & Gass, S. M. (2015). Second language research: Methodology and design Second Edition. Routledge.
Gass, S. M., & Mackey, A. (2013). The Routledge handbook of second language acquisition. Routledge.
McDonough, K., & Mackey, A. (2013). Second language interaction in diverse educational contexts. John Benjamins Publishing.
Gass, S. M., & Mackey, A. (2012). Research methods in second language acquisition: A practical guide 2nd edition. Wiley Blackwell.
Mackey, A. (2012). Input, interaction and corrective feedback in L2 classrooms.  Oxford University Press.
Mackey, A., & Polio, C. (Eds.). (2008). Multiple perspectives on interaction in second language acquisition. Taylor and Francis.
Philp, J., Oliver, R., & Mackey, A. (Eds.). (2008). Second language acquisition and the young learner: Child’s play? John Benjamins.
Mackey, A. (Ed.). (2007). Conversational interaction in second language acquisition: A collection of empirical studies. Oxford University Press.
Gass, S. M., & Mackey A. (2007). Data elicitation for second and foreign language research. Lawrence Erlbaum Associates.
King, K., & Mackey, A. (2007). The bilingual edge: The ultimate guide to how, when and why to teach your child a second language. HarperCollins.

Journal articles

 Philp, J., Borowcyk, M. & Mackey, A. (2017). Exploring the Uniqueness of Child Second Language Acquisition (SLA): Learning, Teaching, Assessment, and Practice. The Annual Review of Applied Linguistics. 37, 1-13
 King, K., & Mackey, A. (2016). Research methodology in second language studies: Trends, concerns and new directions. Article selected for The Modern Language Journal 100th Anniversary Edition, 209–227.
 Bygate, M., Gass, S., Mackey, A., Oliver, R., & Robinson, P. (2016). Theory, empiricism and practice: Commentary on TBLT in ARAL 2016. Annual Review of Applied Linguistics, 36, 1-9.
 Mackey, A. (2015). Methodological practice and progression in second language research methods. AILA Review 7(1), 80–97.
 McDonough, K., Crawford, W., & Mackey, A. (2015). Creativity and EFL students’ language use during a group problem-solving task. TESOL Quarterly.
 Mackey, A. (2014). Exploring questions of balance in interaction research. In J, Hulstijn, R, Young, & L, Ortega (Eds.). Bridging the gap: Cognitive and social approaches to research in language learning and teaching. Studies in Second Language Acquisition, 36(3).
 Goo, J., & Mackey, A. (2013). The case for methodological rigor. Studies in Second Language Acquisition. 35.
 Goo, J., & Mackey, A. (2013). The case against the case against recasts. Studies in Second Language Acquisition, 35(1), 127–165.
 Mackey, A., & Sachs, R. (2012). Older learners in SLA research: A first look at working memory, feedback, and L2 development. Language Learning, 62(3), 704–740.
 Mackey, A., Adams, R., Stafford, C., & Winke, P. (2010). Exploring the relationship between modified output and working memory capacity. Language Learning, 60, 501–533.
 Fujii, A., & Mackey, A. (2009). Interactional feedback in learner-learner interactions in a task-based EFL classroom. International Journal of Applied Linguistics, 47, 267–301.
 McDonough, K., & Mackey, A. (2008). Syntactic priming and ESL question development. Studies in Second Language Acquisition, 30(1), 31–47.
 Mackey, A., Al-Khalil, M., Atanassova, G., Hama, M., Logan-Terry, A. & Nakatsukasa, K. (2007). Teachers’ intentions and learners’ perceptions about corrective feedback in the L2 classroom. Innovations in Language Learning and Teaching, 1(1), 129–152.
 Mackey, A., Kanganas, A., & Oliver, R. (2007). Task familiarity and interactional feedback in child ESL classrooms. TESOL Quarterly, 41(2), 285–312.
 Carpenter, H., Jeon, S., MacGregor, D., & Mackey, A. (2006). Learners’ interpretations of recasts. Studies in Second Language Acquisition, 28(2), 209–236.
 Gass, S. M., & Mackey, A. (2006). Input, interaction and output: An overview. AILA Review, 19, 3–17.
 Mackey, A. (2006). Feedback, noticing and instructed second language learning. Applied Linguistics, 27 (3), 405–430. ∗ Cited over 500 times (Google Scholar)
 Mackey, A. (2006). From introspections, brain scans, and memory tests to the role of social context: Advancing research on interaction and learning (Epilogue). Studies in Second Language Acquisition, 28(2), 369–379.
 McDonough, K., & Mackey, A. (2006). Responses to recasts: Repetitions, primed produc- tion and linguistic development. Language Learning, 56(4) 693–720.
 Mackey, A., & Gass, S. M. (2006). Pushing the methodological boundaries in interaction research: An introduction to the special issue. Studies in Second Language Acquisition, 28 (2), 169–178.
 Philp. J., Oliver, R., & Mackey, A. (2006). The impact of planning time on children's task-based interactions. System, 34(4), 547–565.
 Gass, S. M., Mackey, A., & Ross-Feldman, L. (2005). Task-based interactions in classroom and laboratory settings. Language Learning, 55, 575–611.
 Mackey, A., & Silver, R. (2005). Interactional tasks and English L2 learning by immigrant children in Singapore. System, 33(2), 239–360.
 Mackey, A., Polio, C., & McDonough, K. (2004). The relationship between experience, edu- cation, and teachers’ use of incidental focus-on-form techniques. Language Teaching Research, 8(3), 301–327.
 Mackey, A., Oliver, R., & Leeman, J. (2003). Interactional input and the incorporation of feedback: An exploration of NSNNS and NNSNNS adult and child dyads. Language Learning, 53(1), 35–66. ∗ Cited over 300 times (Google Scholar).
 Mackey, A., Gass, S. M., & McDonough, K. (2000). How do learners perceive interactional feedback. Studies in Second Language Acquisition, 22(4), 471–497. ∗ Cited over 700 times (Google Scholar); 5th most highly cited article in SSLA history.
 Mackey, A., & Philp, J. (1998). Conversational interaction and second language develop- ment: Recasts, responses, and red herrings?.The Modern Language Journal, 82(3), 338–356. ∗ Cited over 1000 times (Google Scholar).

References

External links 
 
IRIS Database

Living people
Applied linguists
Women linguists
Linguists from the United Kingdom
Department of Linguistics and English Language, Lancaster University
Georgetown University faculty
Year of birth missing (living people)